In the 1999 Rugby World Cup qualifiers, there were two repechage positions available to qualify for the final tournament. Seven teams qualified for the repechage, three representing Europe and one each from Africa, Asia, Americas, and Oceania. 

The teams were split into two groups and played a knockout format in each group with the African team given a bye into the second round.

Repechage 1

Repechage 2

Uruguay and Tonga qualified for RWC 1999.

References

Rugby World Cup repechage qualifiers
Repechage
World cup qual